The Discourse on Metaphysics (1686) is a short treatise by Gottfried Wilhelm Leibniz in which he develops a philosophy concerning physical substance, motion and resistance of bodies, and God's role within the universe. It is one of the few texts presenting in a consistent form the earlier philosophy of Leibniz.

The Discourse is closely connected to the epistolary discussion which he carried with Antoine Arnauld. However Leibniz refrained from sending the full text and it remained unpublished until the mid 19th century. Arnauld received only an abridged version in 37 points which resumed whole paragraphs and steered their discussion.

Summary
The metaphysical considerations proceed from God to the substantial world and back to the spiritual realm. The starting point for the work is the conception of God as an absolutely perfect being (I), that God is good but goodness exists independently of God (a rejection of divine command theory) (II), and that God has created the world in an ordered and perfect fashion (III–VII).

At the time of its writing Discourse made the controversial claim That the opinions of... scholastic philosophers are not to be wholly despised (XI). Early work in modern philosophy during the 17th century were based on a rejection of many of the precepts of medieval philosophy. Leibniz saw the failures of scholasticism merely as one of rigor. [If] some careful and meditative mind were to take the trouble to clarify and direct their thoughts in the manner of analytic geometers, he would find a great treasure of important truths, wholly demonstrable.

Leibniz claimed that God's omnipotence was in no way impugned by the thought of evil, but was rather solidified. He endorsed the view that God chose the best of all possible worlds.  In other words, Leibniz believed this world (or reality) to be the best there possibly could be — taking all facts into account, no better world could be imagined, even if we believed that we could think of something more perfect.

Leibniz's conception of physical substance is expanded upon in The Monadology.

See also
Problem of future contingents

Notes

References
Leibniz, Gottfried Wilhelm. Discourse on Metaphysics and the Monadology (trans. George R. Montgomery). Prometheus Books, 1992 (first published by Open Court, 1902).

External links

Discourse on Metaphysics. A complete English translation by George R. Montgomery.


1686 books
Works by Gottfried Wilhelm Leibniz
Metaphysics literature